Roxy: Tonight's the Night Live is a live album by Canadian musician Neil Young. The album is culled from live recordings made at the Roxy Theatre on the Sunset Strip in Los Angeles, shows that celebrated the club's opening as part of Neil Young Tonight's the Night Tour 1973. Neil Young and the backing band he called the Santa Monica Flyers played two sets a night on September 20, 21, and 22, 1973, shortly after the band had finished recording Tonight's the Night. Because of that, almost the entire concert is made up of that album.

The album was also included in the Archives Volume II boxset released in 2020, featuring an additional track "The Losing End" not present on the original version.

Track listing
All songs written by Neil Young, except where noted.

Personnel
Neil Young – vocals, guitar, piano, harmonica
Ben Keith – pedal steel guitar, slide guitar, vocals
Nils Lofgren – piano, guitar, vocals
Billy Talbot – bass
Ralph Molina – drums, vocals

Engineering and production
David Briggs, Neil Young – production
Gene Eichelberger, Denny Purcell – recording engineers
Tim Mulligan – front of house, monitor
John Talbot, Carl Countryman – equipment
John Nowland – mixing (Redwood Digital)
Jeff Pinn – assistant engineer
Chris Bellman – mastering (Bernie Grundman Mastering)
John Hanlon – post-production, mastering

Charts

References

2018 albums
Neil Young live albums
Albums produced by David Briggs (producer)
Reprise Records albums
Albums produced by Neil Young
Albums recorded at the Roxy Theatre